Captain Morten and the Spider Queen is a 2018 Estonian English-language stop motion animated film directed by Kaspar Jancis and co-directed by Riho Unt and Henry Nicholson, from a screenplay by Jancis, Mike Horelick, Paul Risacher, Robin Lyons and Andrew Offiler. An international co-production between the Estonian Nukufilm, Irish Telegael, Belgian Grid VFX and British Calon, the film had its world premiere at the Animafest Zagreb in Croatia on 5 June 2018, before being released in Estonian cinemas on 21 March 2019.

Premise 
Ten-year-old Morten lives with his reluctant, mean-spirited guardian, Anna, as his father, Captain Viks, is away at sea. One day, Morten has a chance meeting with the inept magician Senór Cucaracha, and is accidentally magically shrunken down to the size of an insect and trapped aboard the deck of his own toy ship, alongside a wicked Spider Queen and Scorpion Pirate.

Release and reception 
The film had its world premiere at the Animafest Zagreb in Croatia on 5 June 2018, before being released in Estonian cinemas on 21 March 2019. It was the only Estonian animated film to be released in 2018.

Vladan Petković of Cineuropa gave the film a positive review and praised its puppet animation and character design, but criticised the number of characters and lack of character development. Vassilis Kroustallis, writing for Zippy Frames, gave the film a positive review, giving particular praise to the puppet animation and plot, calling it "a film easy to like and harder to cherish."

Accolades

References

External links 

Captain Morten and the Spider Queen at Eesti Filmi Andmebaas–Estonian-language film database

2018 films
2018 animated films
Belgian animated films
Estonian animated films
Estonian-language films
2010s English-language films